The Basement Collection is a compilation of Edmund McMillen's Flash games released on August 31, 2012. The games were remade with added features and music tracks.

Content 
The games in the collection include:
Triachnid (2006), a physics spider simulation game
Coil (2008), an experimental game
Meat Boy (2008), a Super Meat Boy predecessor
Aether (2008), a space adventure game
Grey-Matter (2008), an anti-shooter game
Spewer (2009), a liquid physics platform game
Time Fcuk (2009), a dark puzzle game

Unlockable content includes:
The Lonely Hermit (2001), a child's story (unlocked by completing Triachnid)
AVGM (2009), an experimental "Abusive Video Game Manipulation"  joke mini-game (unlocked by completing Coil)
Meat Boy (map pack) (2008), the Meat Boy game with different maps (unlocked by completing Meat Boy)
The Box, scans of Edmund McMillen's art at 3–5 years-old that were found in a box kept by his grandmother (unlocked by completing Aether)

Thicker Than Water, a 65-page virtual comic about Edmund McMillen's childhood (unlocked by completing Spewer)
The Chest, eight years of drawings from Edmund McMillen's sketchbooks (unlocked by completing Time Fcuk)

Additionally, under steamapps/common/basement/moregames, four other games can be found:
Carious Weltling (2003)
Clubby the Seal (2004), a side-scrolling action game
Carious Weltling 2 (2005)
Viviparous Dumpling (2005)

Most of the content was previously published at Newgrounds:
The Lonely Hermit (2001)
Tri-achnid (2006)
Coil (2008)
Aether (2008)
Meat Boy (2008)
Grey-Matter (2008)
Meat boy (map pack) (2008)
AVGM (2009)
Spewer (2009)
Time Fcuk (2009)

Notes

References

External links 
 The Basement Collection on Steam

2012 video games
Flash games
Indie video games
Linux games
macOS games
Single-player video games
Video game compilations
Video games developed in the United States
Video games scored by Danny Baranowsky
Windows games

Video games designed by Edmund McMillen